St Rollox railway station served the city of Glasgow, historically in Lanarkshire, Scotland, from 1831 to 1962 on the Glasgow and Garnkirk Railway.

History

First site
Coordinates:
The first site of the station was opened on 1 June 1831 by the Garnkirk and Glasgow Railway. It was also known as Glasgow (Townhead) and Glebe Street.

Second site
Coordinates:
The second station was opened on 1 August 1883 by the Caledonian Railway. A temporary platform was used earlier for collection of tickets. The station closed on 5 November 1962.

References

External Links
RAILSCOT - Glasgow (Townhead)
RAILSCOT - St Rollox [2nd ]

Disused railway stations in Glasgow
Railway stations in Great Britain opened in 1831
Railway stations in Great Britain closed in 1849
Railway stations in Great Britain opened in 1883
Railway stations in Great Britain closed in 1962
1831 establishments in Scotland
1849 disestablishments in Scotland
1883 establishments in Scotland
1962 disestablishments in Scotland